is the debut Japanese single by the South Korean girl group Loona. It was released on September 15, 2021, through Blockberry Creative, Mercury Tokyo and Universal Music Japan alongside its A-side "Hula Hoop".

Background
In June 2021 Blockberry Creative partnered with Universal Music Japan to promote Loona's activities in Japan; an official Japanese page for the group was also created. In the same month the company announced that the group will be having their official Japanese debut in September. On August 27, it was announced that Loona will release the double A-side single, "Hula Hoop / StarSeed" on September 15, with a physical CD release on October 20. The song is written by Sumire Yoshida (Suu) of Silent Siren and is composed by Naoki Kubo.

Promotion
Three different versions of CDs will be available on October 20 titled "Regular" and two limited edition CDs titled "Version A" and "Version B". The DVD attached to the first limited edition A of the CD will contain the making video of the "Star Seed" music video, and the DVD of the first limited edition B will contain "Loona Channel Vol. 1". In addition, it has been decided that the serial number will be included as a common application lottery privilege for the first limited edition and the first press of the regular edition. Fans use this serial number to apply for a Meet & Greet, autographed Polaroid photo, and clear file gift campaign where you can meet all group online. In addition, a solo jacket version of each member will be released exclusively for Universal Music Store. This edition will include a serial code that will allow fan to apply for online events that are different from the first limited edition and regular edition.

An online talk event was held on September 14 where members talked about the new song and a part of the song was revealed for the first time prior to its official release.

Track listing
 CD, digital download & streaming
 "Hula Hoop" – 3:19
 "Star Seed" – 3:01
 "PTT (Paint the Town)" (Japanese version) – 3:22
 "Hula Hoop" (City Pop Version) – 3:14

 DVD (limited A)
 "Star Seed" (music video)
 "Hula Hoop" (making)

 DVD (limited B)
 "Loona Channel Vol.1"

Charts

Release history

Notes

References

2021 singles
Loona (group) songs
Blockberry Creative singles
Universal Music Japan singles